The CAC CA-23 was a planned supersonic, twinjet, two-seat, all-weather fighter aircraft designed by the Commonwealth Aircraft Corporation of Australia.

Design and development
In 1949, the Royal Australian Air Force (RAAF) began assessing replacements for its locally-built Commonwealth Aircraft Corporation (CAC) Mustangs, Gloster Meteors and De Havilland Australia (DHA) Vampires. A series of designs were considered, including the Grumman Panther and an unconventional, twin-jet all-weather fighter: the CAC CA-23.

The Commonwealth Aircraft Corporation (CAC) had developed an extensive in-house design office and capability stemming from Australian Government funding during World War II. On the basis of the CAC track record and a detailed proposal, the Department of Defence Production granted funds to develop the CAC CA-23 concept.

The CAC CA-23 delta wing design concept was a two-seat all-weather fighter with a low set tail. It was originally planned to be powered by two Rolls-Royce Tay engines; the final version was however designed for the more powerful Rolls-Royce Avon turbojet engines. The aircraft was to be fitted with the most up to date radar and electronic equipment. Its anticipated performance was to be in the region of Mach 1.5 which would have been much faster than any contemporary aircraft.

Over the life of the project dozens of mock-up models were made at different scales, with hundreds of detailed drawings, plus wind tunnel tests proving the delta wing was more than satisfactory. The program was described by the British visiting CAC at the time as "the company's project was a most ambitious design for a fighter and as advanced as anything yet seen in any other part of the world."

The four-year project was cancelled in 1953 after the expenditure of £163,195 with extensive aeronautical R&D testing in wind tunnels in Australia and at the Royal Aircraft Establishment. The testing results were so promising and ground breaking for a delta wing design that the Royal Aircraft Establishment requested permission to distribute the results to the major UK aircraft manufacturers and Avro Canada.

Controversy and cancellation

The decision to cancel the CAC CA-23 project was controversial at the time among the Australian political elite and aircraft industry insiders.  The official reason given for the cancellation for the project was that it had failed to meet key design criteria as an all-weather jet fighter, in failing to incorporate a working radar design into the nose cone.  However, the change of the Federal Australian Government had brought about a significant change in policy and priorities around indigenous aircraft design and production. This new policy arose from the November 1951 British mission to Australia on developing aircraft (Aircraft Development Mission) design and cooperation.     Further, the appointment of a British officer, Sir James Donald Hardman, as Chief of the Air Staff for the Royal Australian Air Force on 14 January 1952, with supervision of aircraft procurement, saw a fundamental policy shift occur. Hardman deemed that aircraft design costs were prohibitive and advanced aeronautical R&D design work should be centralised and resources pooled with Britain, in Britain. From this point forward the policy was to adapt proven aircraft for Australian conditions, not start from scratch. Along with this decision, a series of negative reports by the U.K. Ministry of Supply were cited about the CA-23, which contained false assumptions and data comparisons, that led to terse rebuttal letter from Sir Lawrence J Wackett to U.K. Govt.  However, in time, the preference for British designed aircraft was subsequently overturned by the following Australian Chief of Air Staff John McCauley, who once again switched back to American designed and Australian built aircraft.

The CA-23 design work was abandoned in the early 1950s by the Commonwealth Aircraft Corporation, after the government asked CAC to produce an up-engined variant of the North American F-86 Sabre: the CAC Sabre was also powered by the Rolls-Royce Avon.  In correspondence CAC stated "It is not possible to make significant changes to the Sabre for installation Avon engine area without a team of engineers that has been extended to work on a long-range fighter aircraft".  The CAC Sabre used a British jet engine that require extensive redesign work beyond what had been originally expected.

Similarities with other aircraft

The decision by the Australian Department of Defence Production to grant permission for the distribution of the detailed design drawings and wind tunnel tests of the CA-23 by the U.K. Swept Wing Advisory Committee to 15 British Aircraft manufacturers and Avro Canada has always raised questions and theories around the similarities with the English Electric Lightning and especially the Sukhoi Su-7.  The wind tunnel tests carried out by the Royal Aircraft Establishment on the CA-23 and the history of Soviet Agents (Wilfred Vernon and others) associated with the Royal Aircraft Establishment prior to 1953 have led to this conjecture on the similarities. However, no firm conclusions have been made about the design similarities or links.

Specifications

See also
 Hawker P.1081
 CAC Sabre

References
Notes

Bibliography

 Deeb, Raymond. Australian Military Experimental and Prototype Aircraft. Lulu.com: Wizards Military Publications, 2006. .
 Department of Defence Production. Memorandums & Correspondence, 1949–1952; accessed from Australian National Archives 2017
 Australian Archives, CRS A705/1, File 9/1/1891

Abandoned military aircraft projects of Australia
CA-23